Pipturus is a flowering plant genus in the nettle family, Urticaceae.

Selected species
 Pipturus albidus (Hook. & Arn.) A.Gray ex H.Mann – Māmaki (Hawaii)
 Pipturus arborescens (Link) C.B.Rob., 1911
 Pipturus argenteus (G.Forst.) Wedd., 1869 – Queensland grass-cloth plant, native mulberry
 Pipturus forbesii Krajina
 Pipturus platyphyllus  Wedd.
 Pipturus schaeferi J.Florence (French Polynesia)

References

External links

 
Urticaceae genera
Taxonomy articles created by Polbot